Khvormiz-e Olya (also Romanized as Khvormīz-e ‘Olyā and Khowrmīz-e ‘Olyā; also known as Kharmiz, Khoormiz, Khormehr, Khormīz, Khūrmīz, Khūrmīz-e Bālā, Khvormehr, Khvormīz, and Khvormīz) is a village in Khvormiz Rural District of the Central District of Mehriz County, Yazd province, Iran. At the 2006 National Census, its population was 1,870 in 472 households. The following census in 2011 counted 1,860 people in 536 households. The latest census in 2016 showed a population of 2,198 people in 636 households; it was the largest village in its rural district.

References 

Mehriz County

Populated places in Yazd Province

Populated places in Mehriz County